Selina Jen Chia-hsüan (born 31 October 1981) is a Taiwanese singer, television host and actress. She is a member of the Taiwanese girl group S.H.E. On 11 June 2004, she graduated from the National Taiwan Normal University with a Bachelor of Education degree, majoring in Civic Education and Leadership.

On 22 October 2010, Selina was seriously injured in an explosive accident while filming the television series I Have a Date with Spring, along with co-star Yu Haoming. Selina suffered third-degree burns on more than 54% of her body and needed to undergo skin grafting treatment/operation where her hands, legs, and back were injured.

Her sister is actress and singer Lorene Ren.

Career

On 8 August 2000, HIM International Music held a 'Universal 2000 Talent and Beauty Girl Contest' in search for new artists to be signed under their label. Her younger sister Lorene Ren had wanted to join but she was too young. Instead, Jen joined the contest in her place. The contest had about 1000 contestants and after many tiring rounds of competing, seven contestants were left for the 'Cruel Stage' round. The three members of S.H.E were formed from here.

Following the competition, the record company gave all seven contestants an audition. Jen was the eventual winner of the contest. She caught the judges' attention in the first round by performing Coco Lee's "Before I Fall in Love" and entered the final round with "The Closest Stranger". She also sang "Reflection" by Christina Aguilera. Due to her nervousness during the final round, Selina was called out twice, and when she was announced the winner, she was doubtful because there were other contestants who had not been called out. However, all three future members of S.H.E were signed together under HIM International Music.

The name Selina was chosen by her company after taking a personality test; which represents "gentleness". The name initially had two possible spellings: Selina and Selena. Jen eventually chose "Selina" simply because she would be able to dot the i.

Jen collaborated with Tank, a singer-songwriter with HIM, on the song "Solo Love Song", as well with Leehom Wang, for "You're a Song Inside My Heart" a song from his 12th studio album Change Me.

In September 2006, Jen released a bead-design book, Selina Loves Beading.

In January 2015, Jen released her first solo album 3.1415.

As of January 2021, Jen ventured into the F&B industry with packed porridge as her first line of products. Her company is known as Ren Sing Eat Shot (  任性eat下). She occasionally shares Vlogs of her food and hiking experiences on her YouTube channel.

On April 1, 2022, Jen's first horror movie, The Funeral (頭七) was released where she plays the role of a mother. This marks her first appearance in a film nearly twelve years after her accident.

Personal life 
On 22 October 2010, Jen suffered third-degree burns on 54% of her body, mostly her back and legs, during an indoor shooting in Shanghai for the musical series I Have a Date with Spring. Jen was discharged the following year on 19 January 2011, and held a press conference, stating her condition and her intention to return to work.

Prior to her accident, she was on her way to becoming a TV show host.

On 29 May 2010, during a concert at the Taipei Arena, Jen revealed that lawyer Richard Chang was her boyfriend. She married Chang on 31 October 2011. On 4 March 2016, through a post on her Facebook page, Selina announced that she and Chang were planning a divorce. The divorce was finalized on 27 April.

In March 2022, six years after her divorce, Jen confirmed that she was dating Xiao Xu, a non-celebrity who is seven years her junior.

On 13 March 2023, Selina announced on her social media accounts that she is expecting her first child with her boyfriend.

Discography

Studio albums

Extended plays

Filmography

Music videos

Awards and nominations

References

External links 

 
 
 
 
 
 
 Selina Jen at HIM International Music
 S.H.E at HIM International Music

 
1981 births
Living people
21st-century Taiwanese actresses
21st-century Taiwanese singers
Taiwanese television actresses
Taiwanese television presenters
S.H.E members
Musicians from Taipei
Actresses from Taipei
National Taiwan Normal University alumni
Taiwanese idols
Participants in Chinese reality television series
21st-century Taiwanese women singers
Taiwanese women television presenters